Ain Zara is a town and oasis in western Libya, located in the region of Tripolitania.

History
In ancient times it was an important agricultural center. In the surroundings of Ain Zara, remnants of a fourth-century Christian necropolis are located.

During the Italo-Turkish War, Ain Zara witnessed the first known use of airplanes in war, with Italian Army Air Corps Blériot XI and Nieuport IV monoplanes bombing the Ottoman camp at Ain Zara.

In the aftermath, Ain Zara was occupied by Italian troops on December 4, 1911 after heavy fighting with Ottoman forces. After capturing Ain Zara, Italian forces fortified the area and built a new railway section that linked Ain Zara to Tripoli.

In later history, during the Second Libyan Civil War, about 400 prisoners escaped from a prison in the town on September 2, 2018 amid fighting between rival militias for control of the area.

See also
Battle of Ain Zara

Notes

References

 Bruce Vandervort, Verso la quarta sponda. La guerra italiana per la Libia (1911-1912), Rome, Italian Army General Staff, 2012.
 Maggi, Stefano. Le ferrovie nell’Africa italiana: aspetti economici, sociali e strategici, seminario "Nineteenth century transport history. Current trends and new problems".Istituto Universitario Europeo, Fiesole, 1994

Populated places in Tripoli District, Libya